Chikomba Central is a constituency of the National Assembly of the Parliament of Zimbabwe. It is currently represented by Felix Mhona of ZANU–PF.

Members

References 

Parliamentary constituencies in Zimbabwe